Susan Elia MacNeal (born 1968) is an American author best known for her Maggie Hope mystery series of novels, which are set during World War II, mainly in London.

Early life and education
MacNeal attended Nardin Academy in Buffalo, New York, then graduated cum laude with special honors from Wellesley College in 1991 with a degree in English. She cross-registered for classes at MIT and attended the Radcliffe Publishing Course at Harvard University.

Career
MacNeal's background is in publishing, working as an assistant to novelist John Irving and then as an editor at Random House, Viking Penguin, and Dance Magazine. She started her writing career with two nonfiction books and articles on ballet, modern dance, and puppetry.

Her next book, Princess Elizabeth's Spy, was nominated for Macavity Award’s Sue Federer Historical Memorial Award in 2013 Âudiofile, and was included on the New York Times Bestseller List on October 29, 2012.

MacNeal's third novel, His Majesty's Hope, also appeared on the New York Times Bestseller List and was named on Oprah.com's Book of the Week and Seven Compulsively Readable Mysteries (for the Crazy-Smart Reader). It was also nominated for an ITW Thriller Award.

This was followed by The Prime Minister's Secret Agent, another New York Times Bestseller, and Lefty nominee, and, in 2015, by New York Times-bestseller Mrs. Roosevelt's Confidante, which was nominated for an Agatha Award.

The Queen's Accomplice was a USA Today bestseller, a semi-finalist in the Goodreads Choice Awards, and nominated for a Barry Award.

The Paris Spy, the first of the series published in hardcover, then trade paperback, was a New York Times bestseller, Washington Post bestseller, Publishers Weekly bestseller, and nominated for an Agatha Award.

The Prisoner in the Castle was published on August 7, 2018.

All her books include historical figures in her plots, for example, Winston Churchill, Eleanor Roosevelt, Admiral Wilhelm Canaris, Admiral Isoroku Yamamoto, Princess (later Queen) Elizabeth II, etc.  In Mrs. Roosevelt's Confidant the character John Sterling is based on the author Roald Dahl. The heroine, Maggie Hope, was inspired by the real life heroines who worked as secretaries and spies for the SOE during WWII and in The Paris Spy (2017) large parts of the plot have to do with Vera Atkins' experience as a senior SOE figure.

Personal life
She married puppeteer Noel MacNeal on November 6, 1999 at the Union Theological Seminary. They live in Brooklyn, New York with their son.

Publications

Non-fiction books 

Wedding Zen: Simple, Calming Wisdom for the Bride  [Chronicle Books, 2004]
Infused: 100+ Recipes for Infused Liqueurs and Cocktails  [Chronicle Books, 2006]

Maggie Hope Mystery Series

References

External links
 Official Website

1968 births
Living people
American women writers
Barry Award winners
Writers from Buffalo, New York
21st-century American women